The Medina Peaks are rugged, mainly ice-free, peaks surmounting a ridge  long, extending north along the east side of Goodale Glacier to the edge of the Ross Ice Shelf, Antarctica. Some of the peaks were first seen and roughly mapped by the Byrd Antarctic Expedition, 1928–30. They were named by the Advisory Committee on Antarctic Names for Guillermo Medina, Technical Director of the U.S. Navy Hydrographic Office, 1954–60, and of the Naval Oceanographic Office, 1960–64.

See also
Hidden Col

References

Mountains of the Ross Dependency
Amundsen Coast